Philip Francis Brown (June 2, 1842 – March 24, 1921) was an American politician who served in the Virginia House of Delegates.

References

External links 

1842 births
1921 deaths
Democratic Party members of the Virginia House of Delegates
19th-century American politicians